Jan de Vries is a Dutch economic historian. He is Professor emeritus at the University of California, Berkeley. He is best known for his work on the Industrial Revolution and European urbanization, as well as the economic history of the Netherlands. He was elected to the American Philosophical Society in 2002.

References 

Economic historians
20th-century Dutch historians
University of California, Berkeley faculty
Winners of the Heineken Prize
Year of birth missing (living people)
Living people
Corresponding Fellows of the British Academy

Members of the American Philosophical Society
21st-century Dutch historians
Presidents of the Economic History Association